Pteridomyia is a genus of midges in the family Cecidomyiidae. The four described species are all found in Australasia. The genus was first described by Mathias Jaschhof in 2003.

Species
Pteridomyia bilobata Jaschhof, 2003
Pteridomyia grandiuscula (Skuse, 1890)
Pteridomyia gressitti (Yukawa, 1964)
Pteridomyia tasmanica Jaschhof, 2010

References

Cecidomyiidae genera

Insects described in 2003
Taxa named by Mathias Jaschhof
Diptera of Australasia